Chris Perfetti (born December 12, 1988) is an American actor. , he portrays Jacob Hill on the ABC comedy Abbott Elementary, for which he was nominated for a Critics' Choice Award. His other roles include Tim Fletch on the NBC series Crossbones (2014), Brady on the HBO series Looking (2015), and Ben on The CW series In the Dark (2020).

Early life and education 
Chris Perfetti was born in Rochester, New York. He was raised in Webster, New York, and attended Webster Schroeder High School. He is a graduate of the Conservatory of Theater at State University of New York at Purchase, where he was a classmate of Micah Stock.

Career 
Perfetti has appeared in Sons of the Prophet by playwright Stephen Karam, playing the role of Charlie. For his work as Charlie, he received a Theatre World Award for Best Debut Performance in an Off-Broadway play. Starting in December 2012, Perfetti played Bomber in the revival of Picnic by William Inge. Perfetti appeared as Ariel in The Tempest at the Delacorte Theater in the summer of 2015. He also appeared in the indie drama film The Surrogate and Minyan.

Perfetti is also known for starring in Submissions Only (2010), Next Caller (2012), the NBC series Crossbones (2014) as series regular Tim Fletch, and as the character Brady in the second season of the HBO show Looking (2015), and its subsequent series finale television film, Looking: The Movie (2016).

Work

Film

Television

Theatre

References

External links 
 http://www.chrisperfetti.com 
 

American male film actors
American male stage actors
American male television actors
Living people
State University of New York at Purchase alumni
Theatre World Award winners
1988 births
21st-century American male actors